Mikhail Emmanuilovich (Mendelevich) Plisetski (1899 — 1938) was a Soviet diplomat.

Biography
Mikhail Plisetski was born in Gomel to the Lithuanian Jewish family of Mendel Plisetski (1869–30 June 1930) and his wife Sima (née Markovskaya; 1868–1939).

In 1918, Plisetski was in the army and participated in Civil War in Russia. He joined the Communist Party the following year. After the civil war, Plisetski studied at the Economic Institute and worked in the Commissariats of Foreign Affairs and Foreign Trade.

In 1932–1936, he headed the Soviet coal mines at Barentsburg on the Norwegian island of Spitsbergen where he managed the coal concessions (trust "Arctic-carbon"). He also served as the Consul General of the USSR to the island.

He was purged and arrested on 30 April 1937, charged with espionage, and executed on 8 January 1938. As millions of other Russian political prisoners and victims of political repressions, Plisetski was rehabilitated by the Soviet authorities on 3 March 1956.

According to his daughter Maya, the arrest was triggered by Plisetski's meeting in 1934 with his elder brother Lester Plesent, who had been living in the USA since 1912. Other sources suggest that his arrest may have been related to his hiring Richard Pikel, the former secretary of Grigory Zinoviev, who both were also purged and executed.

Family
Mikhail Plisetski was married to Russian silent film actress Rachel Messerer.

Mikhail had two brothers: Israel Plisetski (after moving to USA in 1912 — Lester Plesent) and  Vladimir Plesent, an alumnus of The Moscow Institute of Cinematography, actor, stuntman. Vladimir served in special Air Forces during World War II and was killed in action. Mikhail also had two sisters: Elizabeth (married name Ezerskaya) and Maria (married name Levitskaya).

References

External links
 Documentary film Star of the Invitation, 2007
 Official site of Maya Plisetskaya; Books

1938 deaths
1899 births
People from Gomel
People from Gomelsky Uyezd
Plisetski–Messerer family
Belarusian people of Lithuanian-Jewish descent
Jews from the Russian Empire
Belarusian Jews
Soviet Jews
Bolsheviks
Soviet diplomats
Soviet military personnel of the Russian Civil War
Jews executed by the Soviet Union
Jewish socialists
Great Purge victims from Belarus
Soviet rehabilitations